Four cities submitted bids to host the 2006 Asian Games that were recognised by the Olympic Council of Asia (OCA), all four of which made the OCA Executive Committee's shortlist. OCA selected a host city for the 2006 Asian Games in Busan, South Korea on 12 November 2000, which Doha won. The other shortlisted cities were Kuala Lumpur, Hong Kong, and New Delhi.

The voting process which involved the 41 members of OCA consisted of three rounds, each round eliminating one of the bidding cities. In the first round, New Delhi was eliminated with just two votes. In the second round, Doha won more than half of the available votes, cancelled the need for third round voting.

Bidding process 

 Submission of letters of intent (February 2000)
 Deadline for the submission of bids (30 June 2000)
 OCA Evaluation Committee visit to Doha (13–14 July 2000)
 OCA Evaluation Committee visit to New Delhi (15–16 July 2000)
 OCA Evaluation Committee visit to Kuala Lumpur (17–18 July 2000)
 OCA Evaluation Committee visit to Hong Kong (19–20 July 2000)
 Election of the host city at the 19th OCA General Assembly in Busan, South Korea (12 November 2000)

Candidate cities

References

External links 

 Hong Kong Bid Website (archived)
 Kuala Lumpur Bid Website (archived)

2006 Asian Games
Asian Games bids
2000 in South Korea
November 2000 events in Asia